Moreni may refer to several places in Romania:

Moreni, a town in Dâmbovița County
Moreni, a village in Cetate Commune, Dolj County
Moreni, a village in Prisăcani Commune, Iași County
Moreni, a village in Văleni Commune, Neamț County
Moreni, a village in Deleni Commune, Vaslui County
Moreni (river), a tributary of the Tazlău in Bacău County
Moreni (surname), Italian surname
Moreni oil field, oil field located in Moreni, Dâmbovița County